Janelia Research Campus is a scientific research campus of the Howard Hughes Medical Institute that opened in October 2006. The campus is located in Loudoun County, Virginia, near the town of Ashburn.  It is known for its scientific research and modern architecture. The current Executive Director of the laboratory is Ronald Vale, who is also a vice-president of HHMI. He succeeded Gerald M. Rubin in 2020.  The campus was known as "Janelia Farm Research Campus" until 2014.

Research
Most  HHMI-funded  research supports investigators working at their home institution.   However, some interdisciplinary problems  are difficult to address in existing research settings, and Janelia was built as a separate institution to address such problems in neurobiology.  As of November 2011, it has 424 employees and room for 150 more.
They specifically address the identification of general principles governing information processing by  neuronal circuits, and the development of imaging technologies and computational methods for image analysis. In 2017, it announced a new research area, mechanistic cognitive neuroscience.

At any given time, Janelia supports several large collaborative projects to address needs for data and techniques of interest to a wide scientific community. These currently (as of 2021) include the development of large-scale neuroanatomical data for Drosophila (at the light and electron microscopy levels), a corresponding light level map of the mouse brain, improving the technology of genetically coded fluorescent sensors, and a number of smaller projects.  Results include much improved fluorescent calcium sensors and the first entire full-brain image of Drosophila with neuronal resolution.

The center was designed to emulate the unconstrained and collaborative environments at AT&T Bell Laboratories and Cambridge's Laboratory of Molecular Biology. Researchers are on six-year contracts and fully internally funded, independent of traditional research grant funding.

Gerald M. Rubin was the first executive director of Janelia, and saw it from concept through construction to operation.  Ronald Vale took over as director in early 2020.   There are roughly 50 research laboratories headed by senior researchers including Jennifer Lippincott-Schwartz, Gerry Rubin, Eric Betzig, Karel Svoboda and Barry Dickson.  Previous lab heads include Sean Eddy, Tamir Gonen, Lynn Riddiford, James W. Truman, and Robert Tjian.

Campus
The original Janelia Farm house is listed on the National Register of Historic Places, and the  property was purchased by HHMI from the Dutch software maker Baan Companies in December 2000. The  main campus features a 900-foot (270 m) long, arc-shaped laboratory known as the Landscape Building. A 96 room hotel for conference attendees overlooks a pond and connects to the Landscape Building via a tunnel under Helix drive. Selden Island, a  former sod farm in the Potomac River was added to the campus in 2004 and is popular amongst staff for jogging and recreation.

Many employees live on campus. There are three apartments buildings totaling 240 units, 34 single-family townhouses and 21 studio apartments providing housing for more than a quarter of the staff. Other employees commute to Arlington on an HHMI provided shuttle bus. There are extensive fitness facilities, including a yoga studio, bouldering gym, tennis courts and a soccer field.

Site and landscape design were completed by Dewberry in 2006 and include over four acres of green roof meadow plantings which blend the building into the surrounding site.  In 2006, the institute hired landscape architecture firm Lewis Scully Gionet, Inc., to redo some of the previous landscape work which was completed in fall 2008 (and won an Honor Award from the Maryland and Potomac chapters of the American Society of Landscape Architects). This work includes an architectural water feature, expanded path network, and siting of multiple pieces of artwork,  as well as  comprehensive planting additions.  Additional campus-wide landscape improvement designed by LSG Landscape Architecture followed up until now.

Research Facilities

Computational Infrastructure 
The storage and computational requirements of modern neuroscience can be extremely demanding. Some two-photon microscopes can generate data at over 5GB/s.  Electron microscopy connectomics can be especially demanding. The FlyEM dataset alone is a 400TB, 34431 x 39743 x 41407 64-bit image. The analysis of a similar dataset took nearly 7000 GPU hours.

Computational infrastructure available to researchers at Janelia includes a high performance 7000 core  cluster, 5 petabytes of storage and an off-site data center where data is backed up nightly.

Animal Facilities 

An accredited vivarium houses laboratory animals including zebrafish, mice and rats. Support staff assist with routine care, breeding and surgeries.  Routine care is aided by automation. Several fly flipping robots help maintain Drosophila stocks by transferring them to vials of fresh food. Two robot arms aid in the sanitation of mouse cages. One arm picks dirty cages from a stack and inserts them into an autoclave, the other removes sanitized cages and stacks them.

Advanced Imaging Center 

Scientists from around the world can apply to run their experiments on Janelia developed microscopes at the Advanced Imaging Center.

Community involvement
Together with the  Loudoun Academy of Science, HHMI donates approximately $1 million  annual support for science education through the Loudoun County Public School District. Janelia also hosts a quarterly public lecture series for the public.

See also 
 Salk Institute for Biological Studies
 Cold Spring Harbor Laboratory

References

Further reading 
 Gerald M. Rubin: Establishing a new Research Institute: The Howard Hughes Medical Institute's Janelia Farm Research Campus. in: Perspectives of Research - Identification and Implementation of Research Topics by Organizations - Ringberg-Symposium 2006 (Max-Planck-Forum 7) Max-Planck-Gesellschaft (Hrsg.), München 2007, ISSN 1438-8715

Buildings and structures in Loudoun County, Virginia
Rafael Viñoly buildings
Buildings and structures completed in 2006
Organizations established in 2006
Medical research institutes in the United States
Neuroscience research centers in the United States
2006 establishments in Virginia
Research institutes in Virginia